Brave New Hope is an EP by Polish singer Basia, released by Epic Records in 1990.

Overview
The compilation was originally released in the United States as an EP featuring seven songs (Epic CD 49K-73593). Of these, the title track is presented twice: in its original version from the album London Warsaw New York and also in a new mix (subtitled "Brave New Mix"). The other tracks include Phil Harding remixes of two other songs from London Warsaw New York: "Until You Come Back to Me (That's What I'm Gonna Do)" and "Cruising for Bruising", an alternative version of "From Now On", first available on Basia's 1986 single "Run for Cover", and two non-album songs, "Masquerade" and "Come to Heaven", previously available only as B-sides on singles "Baby You're Mine" and "Cruising for Bruising", respectively. A later release of the album (Epic CD EK 48644) added two more songs, "Give Me That" and "Forgive and Forget", previously unavailable on the US market and only released as B-sides in Europe and Japanese edition of Time and Tide. The compilation wasn't available in Japan, where instead the new mix of "Brave New Hope" was released as a CD single, backed with the remix of "Until You Come Back to Me".

Track listing

Original release

Reissue

References

External links
 The official Basia website
 Brave New Hope on Discogs

1990 albums
Basia compilation albums
Epic Records albums